Say the Name is an American gospel album released on July 16, 2002 by Martha Munizzi on the Integrity Music label.

Track listing
"Rejoice" – 05:22
"Shout" – 05:35
"It's Time To Dance" – 04:38
"God Has A Way" – 04:37
"Say The Name" - 10:02
"Blessed Be The Lord" – 06:05
"Because Of Who You Are" - 08:38
"Holy Spirit Fill This Room" – 05:59
"Filled With Praise" – 05:40
"At All Times" – 06:55

Awards
Say the Name was nominated for a Grammy Award in 2006 in the Best Traditional Soul Gospel Album category. The title song was nominated for a 2005 Dove Award in the Contemporary Gospel Song of the Year category.

Award Nominations

References

Martha Munizzi albums
2002 live albums